grOnk, or GRoNK,  was a Canadian literary magazine begun in 1967 by bpNichol and others  (for example, David Aylward, David W. Harris (later David UU; co-editor for the first series (8 issues, 1967), and editor of most of the seventh series (5 of 8 issues, 1971)), and Rah Smith (i.e. Robert Hindley-Smith). After the primary 8 series of 8 issues each were published, it was Nichol's efforts that maintained the irregular periodical, with guest editors including (but not limited to) Nelson Ball, jwcurry, Steve McCaffery and R. Murray Schafer. An offshoot of Ganglia Press's Ganglia magazine (founded in Toronto, Ontario, in 1965 by Aylward and Nichol), grOnk began with material gathered for Ganglia's sixth issue and became a monthly publication focusing on concrete poetry and "the language revolution" underway in Canada at the time (principally in Toronto and Vancouver), publishing a wide variety of "extralinear" writing from an international cast of contributors anchored in a context of parallel developments in Canadian literature. "GrOnk brought together British, Czech, American, Canadian, French and Austrian concrete and experimental practitioners..."

One of Canada's longest running independent little magazines, grOnk ran for 126 distinct issues in a wide range of book and magazine formats utilizing diverse print technologies such as letterpress, rubberstamp, mimeography, offset and, later, xerography and audiocassette, including many hand-wrought additions (for examples, John Riddell's "A hOle in the Head" included many handcoloured pages and scissor-cut windows, while jwcurry's "AS IS OR WITH" was drawn entirely by hand throughout the edition). 6 issues, the grOnk Piggyback Series, ran as broadside sections in the Toronto literary tabloid Poetry Canada Review (1987–89).

grOnk ceased publication in 1988 with the death of bpNichol, although some numbers have continued to be issued in the grOnk Inadmissible Series by Nicky Drumbolis's Letters and jwcurry's Room 302 Books.

References

Further reading
 Geoff Hancock The Form of the Thing: An Interview with bpNichol on Ganglia and grOnk. Rampike, 12.1 (Fall 2001), 33
 Avant Canada: Poets, Prophets, Revolutionaries, edited by Gregory Betts & Christian Bök (eds), note 21, Wilfrid Laurier University Press, 2019
 Encyclopedia of Post-Colonial Literatures in English by Eugene Benson & L.W. Conolly (eds) Routledge, 2005, p. 1100

External links
 grOnk picture bibliography
 MacOdrum Library of Carleton University: Ganglia & grOnk
 One Zero Zero - A Virtual Library of English Canadian Small Press 1945-2044 Ganglia/grOnk 1965-1988
 bpNichol Online Archive
 David UU
 grOnk magazine: Canadian Concrete Poetry 1967-1988 (Part 1)

1967 establishments in Ontario
1988 disestablishments in Ontario
Defunct literary magazines published in Canada
Magazines established in 1967
Magazines disestablished in 1988
Poetry magazines published in Canada
Magazines published in Toronto